Nacellidae is a taxonomic family of sea snails or true limpets, marine gastropod molluscs in the subclass Patellogastropoda.

Taxonomy 

Nacellidae was the only family in the superfamily Nacelloidea as described by Bouchet & Rocroi (2005),. However a molecular phylogenetic study of Patellogastropoda by Nakano & Ozawa (2007) found that Nacellidae was recovered within Lottioidea, as shown in the following cladogram:

As a result Nacellidae was moved to Lottioidea in the taxonomic revision of Bouchet et al (2017). More recently, a recent phylogenomic study found Nacellidae as a sister to Patellidae, which suggests that Nacellidae should be transferred to Patelloidea.

Genera 
Genera within the family Nacellidae include:
 Cellana H. Adams, 1869
 Naccula Iredale, 1924
 Nacella Schumacher, 1817 - type genus
 Macclintockia Gould, 1846: taxon inquirendum
 - one species Macclintockia scabra (Gould, 1846): synonym of Lottia scabra (Gould, 1846)

References

External links
 Cunha T.J. & Giribet G. (2019). A congruent topology for deep gastropod relationships. Proceedings of the Royal Society B: Biological Sciences. 286(20182776): 1-8